Ryfoss is a village in Vang Municipality in Innlandet county, Norway. The village is located along the river Storåne, just west of the lake Slidrefjorden. The European route E16 highway runs through the village, heading west through the Filefjell mountains on the way to the west coast of Norway. The village has some industry, including a sawmill, a concrete goods factory, as well as a small shopping centre.

References

Vang, Innlandet
Villages in Innlandet